Uttarpara or Uttarpara Kotrung is a city and a municipality of Hooghly district in the Indian state of West Bengal. It is a part of the area covered by Kolkata Metropolitan Development Authority (KMDA). It is located along the Hooghly river, across from the Dakshineswar Kali Temple. Uttarpara is home to the Uttarpara Jayakrishna Public Library, Asia's oldest free public library.

Geography

Uttarpara is at the southernmost part of Hooghly district. It is separated from Bally, Howrah by Bally Canal (Bally Khal). The old name of Uttarpara was "North Bally". A bridge was constructed in 1846 over Bally Canal to connect Uttarpara with Bally.

Demographics

As per 2011 Census of India Uttarpara had a total population of 159,147 of which 81,410 (51%) were males and 77,737 (49%) were females. Population below 6 years was 11,760. The total number of literates in Uttarpara Kotrung was 133,610 (90.65% of the population over 6 years).

 India census, Uttarpara Kotrung had a population of 150,204. Males constitute 52% of the population and females 48%. Uttarpara Kotrung has an average literacy rate of 79%, higher than the national average of 59.5%: male literacy is 82% and female literacy is 76%. In Uttarpara Kotrung, 8% of the population is under 6 years of age.

Kolkata Urban Agglomeration
The following Municipalities and Census Towns in Hooghly district were part of Kolkata Urban Agglomeration in 2011 census: Bansberia (M), Hugli-Chinsurah (M), Bara Khejuria (Out Growth), Shankhanagar (CT), Amodghata (CT), Chak Bansberia (CT), Naldanga (CT), Kodalia (CT), Kulihanda (CT), Simla (CT), Dharmapur (CT), Bhadreswar (M), Champdani (M), Chandannagar (M Corp.), Baidyabati (M), Serampore (M), Rishra (M), Rishra (CT), Bamunari (CT), Dakshin Rajyadharpur (CT), Nabagram Colony (CT), Konnagar (M), Uttarpara Kotrung (M), Raghunathpur (PS-Dankuni) (M), Kanaipur (CT) and Keota (CT).

Economy

Hindustan Motors
Uttarpara was home to India's first car factory, Hindustan Motors, which produced the legendary Ambassador cars. The plant was closed in 2014 when production of the Ambassador was scrapped.

Titagarh Wagons
Titagarh Wagons is considered one of the leading wagon manufacturer in India. After the acquisition of sick Italy-based Firema Trasporti, the company encouraged the modernisation of its coach making plant at Uttarpara, which in present scenario is capable of producing ultra-modern India-made aluminum metro coaches.

Hiranandani Group
The Hiranandani Group entered into an MoU in the state of West Bengal to set up logistics and hyperscale data center park in the region. The group signed an MoU to acquire a 100-acre land at Uttarpara, Kolkata from Hindustan Motors to set up an integrated logistics and hyperscale datacentre park by Hiranandani group companies GreenBase and Yotta respectively. The combined investment by the group and their customers is estimated to cross Rs 10,000 crore.

Transport

Roadways
State Highway 6/ Grand Trunk Road (G.T. Road) passes through Uttarpara.

Bus service
 2 Chunchura Court - Dakshineswar
 285 Serampore - Salt Lake Sector-5
3 Serampore - Bagbazar/Salt Lake

Railways
Uttarpara railway station is situated in the Howrah-Bardhaman main line. It is part of the Kolkata Suburban Railway system.

Culture

Uttarpara boasts of a rich cultural heritage. The town once boasted of sylvan peace, beautiful buildings, epitome of great architectural works and steeped in cultural heritage. Bengali poet Michael Madhusudan Dutt spent his last days in Uttarpara Joykrishna Library. Uttarpara is also the home of numerous temples and is a destination site for tourists during Durga Puja for its majestic Balaka pandal.

Education

Colleges
 Swami Niswambalananda Girls' College
 Raja Peary Mohan College

High school
 Uttarpara Govt. High School
 Dream Land School 
 Uttarpara Amarendra Vidyapith
 Bhadrakali High School
 Uttarpara Girls High School
 Hindmotor High School
Vision International School

Police
Uttarpara police station has jurisdiction over  Uttarpa-Kotrung and Konnagar Municipal areas and parts of Sreerampur Uttarpara CD Block. The police station is under Chandannagar Police Commissionerate.

Notable people
Pramoda Charan Banerji, judge in the Allahabad High Court.
Amarendra Chatterjee, freedom fighter.
Malay Roy Choudhury, founder of Hungry generation Movement.
Samir Roychoudhury, member of Krittibas group and co-founder of the "Hungryalist" movement.
Manilal Nag, sitar player.
Pritam Kotal, footballer (India, Mohun Bagan A.C., Delhi Dynamos FC).
Babul Supriyo, politician, singer and actor.

See also
Uttarpara Public Library

References

External links
 Website of Uttarpara Municipality
 Website of Uttarpara

Cities and towns in Hooghly district
Neighbourhoods in Kolkata
Kolkata Metropolitan Area
Cities in West Bengal